Justice League Sourcebook is a supplement published by Mayfair Games in 1990 for the superhero role-playing game DC Heroes, itself based on superheroes found in DC Comics.

Contents
Justice League Sourcebook gives details about the history of the Justice League, its allies and enemies, and complete game statistics for every member to join the team since its founding.

The book covers:
 A short history of the Justice League
 Members of the League past and present
 How the League works and its affiliations
 Maps of three headquarters
 Various friends and allies of the League
 Supervillains

Publication history
Mayfair Games first published the licensed role-playing game DC Heroes in 1985, and followed this with several supplements and adventures including the Justice League Sourcebook, a 128-page softcover book published in 1990 that was designed by Jack A. Barker and Ray Winninger, with interior illustrations by the staff of DC Comics, cartography by Mari Paz Cabardo, Jerry O'Malley, and Ike Scottand, and cover art by Kevin Maguire, Joe Rubinstein, and Helen Vesik.

Reception
In Issue 172 of Dragon (August 1991), Allen Varney indicated that Justice League Sourcebook held an overwhelming amount of information, asking "Do you want your brain to explode from sheer data pressure?" Varney said his eyes started to glaze over from information overload, but admitted that the "text is clear, well-researched and respectful."

Other reviews
White Wolf #26 (April/May, 1991)

References

DC Heroes supplements
Justice League in other media
Role-playing game supplements introduced in 1990